This Is Space: The Space Daze Trilogy is a various artists compilation album released on April 29, 1997 by Cleopatra Records.

Reception

AllMusic gave This Is Space four and out of five stars, calling it "a worthy collection of mostly beatless recordings throughout the ages" and "a surprisingly solid collection of space recordings from the 1970s, '80s and '90s, with Kraftwerk, Tangerine Dream, Eno, Gong, Klaus Schulze, Fripp & Eno, Roxy Music, David Bowie and Hawkwind representing the first onset of ambience."

Track listing

Personnel
Adapted from the This Is Space: The Space Daze Trilogy liner notes.

 Dave Thompson – liner notes
 Eunah Lee – design

Release history

References

External links 
 This Is Space: The Space Daze Trilogy at Discogs (list of releases)

1997 compilation albums
Cleopatra Records compilation albums